Parvoscincus aurorus  is a species of skink found in the Philippines.

Habitat
Parvoscincus Aurorus' are generally found at the higher elevations of the Sierra Madre Occidental mountain range, in Aurora province.

References

Parvoscincus
Reptiles described in 2013
Taxa named by Charles W. Linkem
Taxa named by Rafe M. Brown